Grand Prince Alexander or Aleksandr Mikhailovich (7 October 1301 – 29 October 1339) was a Prince of Tver as Alexander I and Grand Prince of Vladimir-Suzdal as Alexander II. His rule was marked by the Tver Uprising in 1327. Aleksandr Mikhailovich was executed in the Golden Horde together with his son Fyodor.

Life 

Aleksandr was a second son of Prince Mikhail of Tver by his wife, Anna of Kashin. As a young man, his appanages included Kholm and Mikulin. In 1322, he continued the Tver princes' opposition to the rise of Moscow when he rather spectacularly waylaid Grand Prince Yury of Moscow (who had schemed against Aleksandr's father to gain the yarlyk or patent of office from the khan of the Golden Horde, the Mongol kingdom which ruled Russia and much of central Asia in the 13th and 14th centuries) as Yury journeyed with the tribute from Novgorod to Moscow.

Four years later, Aleksandr succeeded his childless brother Dmitry the Terrible Eyes who had been executed on behest of Uzbeg Khan in the Horde after Dmitry avenged his father's death by murdering Yury.

In 1327, a Tatar official, the baskak Shevkal (the cousin of Uzbeg), arrived in Tver from the Horde, with a large retinue. They took up residence at Aleksandr's palace and, according to chronicle reports, started terrorizing the city, randomly robbing and killing. Rumors spread that Shevkal wanted to kill the prince, occupy the throne for himself and introduce Islam to the city. When, on 15 August 1327, the Tatars tried to take a horse from a deacon named Dyudko, he cried for help and a mob of furious people rushed on the Tatars and killed them all. Shevkal and his remaining guards were burnt alive in one of the houses where they had attempted to hide.

The massacre led inevitably to Tatar reprisals. Indeed, the whole incident may have been a provocation by the Tatars to destroy Aleksandr and the Tver princes.  Ivan Kalita of Moscow, brother of Yury of Moscow who had been murdered by Dmitri the Terrible Eyes in 1322, immediately went to the Horde and, before Aleksandr had time to justify himself to Uzbeg Khan, persuaded the khan to grant Moscow the yarlik or patent of office for the throne of Vladimir. The khan also sent Ivan at the head of an army of 50,000 soldiers to punish Tver. Alexander fled with his family to Novgorod, but he was not accepted there for fear of the Tatars, so he went on to Pskov.

Pskov not only allowed Aleksandr to enter their city, but made him their prince. Desiring to save the Russian land from further devastation — had Ivan Kalita left Aleksandr in Pskov, the Tatars would have certainly sent another punitive expedition which would have destroyed that city — Aleksandr agreed to abandon the city, but the residents of Pskov would not let him go. Metropolitan Feognost (Theognostus) arrived in Novgorod and he and Archbishop Moisei of Novgorod (1325–1330; 1352–1359) excommunicated the city at the behest of Ivan Kalita. In 1329, fulfilling the order of the khan, Ivan Kalita and many other princes declared war to Pskov. Aleksander fled into Lithuania and then to Sweden, after which the metropolitan lifted the ban of excommunication against Pskov. Aleksander returned to Pskov a year and a half later under the patronage of Gediminas, Grand Duke of Lithuania.

In 1335, Aleksandr sent his son, Fyodor, to the Horde in order to gain forgiveness. Two years later in 1337 he went there himself. Uzbeg Khan, at least for a time, forgave his old enemy and sent him back to Tver. This led to renewed hostilities with Moscow, which Tver' could not sustain.

On October 29, 1339, Aleksandr and Fyodor were quartered (chopped into four pieces) in Sarai, the capital city of the Horde, by the orders of Uzbeg Khan.

Family 

Alexander was married ca. 1320 to Anastasia of Halych and had eight children:
 Fyodor of Tver (died 1339)
 Lev (born 1321, date of death unknown)
 Mikhail II of Tver (1333–1399)
 Vsevolod of Kholm (died 1364)
 Andrey (died 1365)
 Vladimir (died 1365)
 Maria (died 1399), married to Simeon of Russia
 Uliana (ca. 1325–1392), married to Algirdas

See also
 Rulers of Russia family tree

References

External links
 Biography at hrono.ru 
 Biography at rulex.ru 
 Pedigree of Alexander of Tver 

1301 births
1339 deaths
14th-century murdered monarchs
14th-century Russian princes
Grand Princes of Vladimir
Princes of Tver
Murdered Russian monarchs
Rurik dynasty
Yurievichi family
Executed Russian people
People executed by the Golden Horde
14th-century executions
Eastern Orthodox monarchs